The National Immunisation Advisory Committee (NIAC) is an Irish advisory body that advises the Chief Medical Officer and Department of Health in the area of immunisation procedures and related matters. NIAC was established within the Royal College of Physicians of Ireland (RCPI) in 1998. It comprises representatives from a broad range of medical and healthcare organisations with expertise in immunisation.

Purpose
According to its Term of Reference, the purposes of NIAC are as follows:
 To provide advice to the Department of Health on vaccines, immunisation and related health matters in the Irish context
 To develop and disseminate the National Immunisation Guidelines for Ireland
 To advocate for best immunisation practices

Membership
The members of NIAC is nominated by the organisations listed and approved by the President of the RCPI. Those nominated to NIAC will serve a four-year term and may only be re-elected to serve one additional term.

As of 2021, Professor Karina Butler serves as the Chair of NIAC. She also sit on the National Public Health Emergency Team (NPHET).

Voting membership
Voting membership nominating organisations:

Additional Membership
In addition to voting membership, NIAC memberships are also nominated from the following organisation. The additional members have access to NIAC meetings, papers and may contribute to NIAC discussion, but will not have voting rights in order to maintain NIAC's independence.

 Department of Health
 Health Service Executive
 Health Products Regulatory Authority
 Department of Health, Northern Ireland
 Medical Secretaries (Specialist Registrars in Public Health Medicine, Infectious Diseases or Paediatrics)

Meetings
NIAC will meet once every two months.  However, the Chair of NIAC or President of the RCPI have the power to call an extraordinary meeting if required. A record of attendance is maintained at every meeting and minutes of meeting will be included in the NIAC annual report and publicly available. NIAC meetings requires the presence of at least 50% of the voting members plus one voting member during the entire meeting and for decision making purposes.

See also 
 National Immunization Technical Advisory Group (the global concept)
 Advisory Committee on Immunization Practices (United States)
 Joint Committee on Vaccination and Immunisation (United Kingdom)
 National Advisory Committee on Immunization (Canada)

References

External links
 
 List of members
 Immunisation Guidelines

Department of Health (Ireland)